William Tomomori Fukuda Sharpe (born 22 September 1986) is an English actor, writer, and director. He is known for writing, directing, and starring in the 2016 dark comedy-drama Flowers. He starred in the drama series Giri/Haji and the second season of the HBO series The White Lotus.

Early life and education
Sharpe was born in London and raised in Tokyo until the age of eight. His mother is Japanese. After returning to the United Kingdom, he studied at Winchester College.

After graduating from Winchester, Sharpe read classics at the University of Cambridge, where he was the president of the Footlights Revue.

Career
Sharpe graduated in 2008 and joined the Royal Shakespeare Company for their 2008/2009 season. Sharpe spent a year at the RSC and appeared in such plays as The Taming of the Shrew, The Merchant of Venice, and The Tragedy of Thomas Hobbes, in which he played a young Isaac Newton. He played the character of Yuki Reid in the BBC medical drama Casualty.

In 2009, he directed and co-wrote, along with his friend Tom Kingsley, the short film Cockroach. The pair's first feature-length film, Black Pond, was shown at the Prince Charles Cinema in London from November 2011. Shortly after, he was co-nominated for a BAFTA Award for Outstanding Debut by a British Writer, Director or Producer for the film.

Sharpe is known for writing, directing, and starring in the dark comedy-drama Flowers, which premiered on Channel 4 in 2016. Starring Olivia Colman, Julian Barratt, Daniel Rigby and Sophia Di Martino, Flowers is a black comedy that tackles mental health, and follows the four eccentric members of the Flowers family as they navigate their lives together, and their own inner demons. The first series won a BAFTA Television Award for best scripted comedy, and the second series aired in 2018 to widespread critical acclaim.

In 2020, Sharpe won a BAFTA Television Award for his supporting role as Rodney Yamaguchi in BBC drama Giri/Haji—a role The Independent called 'one of the most riotously funny turns since Richard E Grant stepped out as Withnail.'

Sharpe directed and co-wrote the 2021 biographical comedy-drama film The Electrical Life of Louis Wain, starring Benedict Cumberbatch as the artist Louis Wain.

In 2022, Sharpe joined the cast of the HBO series The White Lotus in its second season, set in Sicily, as Ethan Spiller, a newly wealthy tech entrepreneur on vacation.

In 2023, Sharpe was announced as the director of the film adaptation of Japanese Breakfast front-woman Michelle Zauner's autobiography Crying in H Mart.

Personal life
His brother is composer Arthur Sharpe, who has written music for The Darkest Universe, Black Pond, and Flowers. Will Sharpe has type two bipolar disorder.

Since 2009, Sharpe has been in a relationship with actress Sophia Di Martino, with whom he has two children, born in 2019 and 2021.

Filmography

References

External links
 

1986 births
Living people
Alumni of the University of Cambridge
English male stage actors
English male television actors
English television directors
English television writers
English people of Japanese descent
Male actors of Japanese descent
Male actors from London
People from Camden Town
Writers from London
21st-century English male actors
British male television writers
British male actors of Japanese descent
Best Supporting Actor BAFTA Award (television) winners